The bamboo foliage-gleaner (Anabazenops dorsalis), also known as the crested foliage-gleaner or dusky-cheeked foliage-gleaner, is a species of bird in the family Furnariidae. It is found in Bolivia, Brazil, Colombia, Ecuador, and Peru.

Its natural habitat is subtropical or tropical moist lowland forest.

References

bamboo foliage-gleaner
Birds of the Ecuadorian Amazon
Birds of the Peruvian Amazon
bamboo foliage-gleaner
Taxonomy articles created by Polbot
Taxa named by Philip Sclater
Taxa named by Osbert Salvin